Fodinoidea pupieri is a moth of the family Erebidae. It was described by Hervé de Toulgoët in 1972. It is found on the Comoros.

References

 

Spilosomina
Moths described in 1972